Gae or GAE may refer to:
 GAE (company), a Japanese video game company
 Andoa language, an extinct language of Peru

People
 Gae Aulenti (1927–2012), Italian architect
 Gae Polisner, American author

Other uses
 A misspelling of the term "gay" (used in internet memes)
 Global American Empire 
 GAE SA, a Cuban government-owned holding company; see Julio Casas Regueiro
 Gallic acid equivalence method
 Georgia Association of Educators
 Google App Engine
 Granulomatous amoebic encephalitis
 Grand Aire Express, a defunct American airline
 Grupos Armados Españoles, a defunct Spanish paramilitary organisation
 Warekena language, spoken in Brazil and Venezuela